Giusvan Piovaccari (born 7 September 1973) is an Italian racing cyclist. He rode in the 1997 Tour de France.

References

1973 births
Living people
Italian male cyclists
Place of birth missing (living people)